Nepal competed at the 1988 Summer Olympics in Seoul, South Korea.  Bidhan Lama, won a bronze medal in  taekwondo which was then an exhibition sport.

Competitors
The following is the list of number of competitors in the Games.

Athletics

Men

Track events

Combined events

Women

Track events

Boxing

Judo

Men

Shooting

Women

Weightlifting

Men

References

Official Olympic Reports

Nations at the 1988 Summer Olympics
1988
1988 in Nepalese sport